In molecular biology, proteins containing the carboxyl transferase domain include biotin-dependent carboxylases. This domain carries out the following reaction: transcarboxylation from biotin to an acceptor molecule. There are two recognised types of carboxyl transferase. One of them uses acyl-CoA and the other uses 2-oxo acid as the acceptor molecule of carbon dioxide. All of the members in this family use acyl-CoA as the acceptor molecule.

References

Protein families